Sinister Journey is a 1948 American Western film directed by George Archainbaud and written by Doris Schroeder. The film stars William Boyd, Andy Clyde, Rand Brooks, Elaine Riley, John Kellogg and Don Haggerty. The film was released on June 11, 1948, by United Artists.

Plot
Lee Garvin has eloped with the daughter of a railroad man who didn't approve of the marriage. Hoppy steps in when the young man is framed for murder.

Cast 
 William Boyd as Hopalong Cassidy
 Andy Clyde as California Carlson
 Rand Brooks as Lucky Jenkins
 Elaine Riley as Jessie Garvin
 John Kellogg as Lee Garvin
 Don Haggerty as Harmon Roberts
 Stanley Andrews as Tom Smith
 Harry Strang as Banks
 John Butler as Storekeeper
 Herbert Rawlinson as Marshal Reardon 
 Will Orleans as Ex-con Ben Watts 
 Wayne C. Treadway as Engineer

References

External links 
 
 
 
 

1948 films
American black-and-white films
Films directed by George Archainbaud
United Artists films
American Western (genre) films
1948 Western (genre) films
Hopalong Cassidy films
1940s English-language films
1940s American films